John Pettus (1550–1614), of Elm Street, Norwich, Norfolk, was an English Member of Parliament for Norwich in 1601 and 1604. He was Mayor of Norwich in 1608–9.

References

1550 births
1614 deaths
17th-century English people
English MPs 1601
Mayors of Norwich
Politicians from Norwich